Niederfrohna is a municipality in the district of Zwickau in Saxony in Germany.

References 

Zwickau (district)